is a Japanese popular singer and actress.

Yukimura made her debut with the song  in 1953. Her style of singing varied from jazz to rock and roll. She became one of the three most popular female singers in the early postwar Japan, along with Chiemi Eri and Hibari Misora.

On her 1974 album Super Generation, she sang Ryoichi Hattori's songs along with four popular musicians: Masataka Matsutoya, Shigeru Suzuki, Tatsuo Hayashi and Haruomi Hosono.

Eri, who died in 1982, and Misora, who died in 1989, also recorded songs with Yukimura as a group in the 1950s, but those recordings had not been released for about 50 years because they each belonged to separate record labels. In 2004, their album including those songs was finally released for the first time.

Filmography 
 Alice in Wonderland (1951) (theme song for the Japanese release of Disney film)
  (1955)
  (1956)
 Arashi (1956)
  aka The Princess of Badger Palace (1958)
  (1958)
 Hanayome-san wa sekai-ichi (1959)
 {{nihongo|You Can Succeed, Too|君も出世ができる|Kimi mo shusse ga dekiru}} (1964)
 The Laughing Frog (2002)

References

External links 
 

Japanese women singers
Japanese idols
Japanese actresses
1937 births
Living people
Singers from Tokyo